The  was a regular edition of an annual Japanese national cup tournament. It started on 3 September 2011 and ended on 1 January 2012 with the final at National Stadium in Tokyo, Japan, won by FC Tokyo 4–2 against Kyoto Sanga.

The cup winner were guaranteed a place in the 2012 AFC Champions League.

Calendar

(*1)a total number of four games were postponed to 7 or 14 September due to tropical storm.
(*2)a total number of eight games were postponed to 12 October due to event clashes of quarterfinals of 2011 J.League Cup, and November 9 was reserved for Cerezo Osaka and Hokkaido University of Education Iwamizawa Campus in case of event clashes if Cerezo entered the 2011 AFC Champions League semi-finals (but game was not postponed as Cerezo was eliminated in quarter-finals).
(*3)Kashiwa Reysol's game was postponed to 21 December due to the participation in 2011 FIFA Club World Cup.

Participating clubs

Starting in the First Round
Prefectural finals winners – 47 teams

Hokkaidō – Hokkaido University of Education Iwamizawa Campus
Aomori – Hachinohe University
Iwate – Grulla Morioka
Miyagi – Sony Sendai*
Akita – Blaublitz Akita
Yamagata – Yamagata University School of Medicine
Fukushima – Fukushima United
Ibaraki – University of Tsukuba
Tochigi – Tochigi Uva
Gunma – Arte Takasaki
Saitama – Heisei International University
Chiba – Kashiwa Reysol U-18
Tokyo –  Machida Zelvia
Kanagawa – YSCC Yokohama
Yamanashi – Yamanashi Gakuin University High School
Nagano – Matsumoto Yamaga
Niigata – Japan Soccer College
Toyama – Toyama Shinjo Club
Ishikawa – Zweigen Kanazawa
Fukui – Maruoka Phoenix
Shizuoka – Shizuoka Sangyo University
Aichi – Chukyo University
Mie – Suzuka Rampole
Gifu – FC Gifu Second
Shiga – Sagawa Shiga
Kyoto – SP Kyoto
Osaka – Hannan University
Hyōgo – Sanyo Electric Sumoto SC
Nara – Nara Club
Wakayama – Arterivo Wakayama
Tottori – Yonago Kita High School
Shimane – Dezzolla Shimane
Okayama – Fagiano Okayama Next
Hiroshima – Hiroshima University of Economics
Yamaguchi – Renofa Yamaguchi FC
Kagawa – Kamatamare Sanuki
Tokushima – Sanyo Electric Tokushima SC
Ehime – Ehime FC Shimanami
Kochi – Kōchi University
Fukuoka – Fukuoka University
Saga – Saga LIXIL FC
Nagasaki – V-Varen Nagasaki
Kumamoto – Kumamoto Teachers Club
Ōita – Hoyo A.C. Elan Ōita
Miyazaki – Miyazaki Sangyo-keiei University
Kagoshima – FC Kagoshima
Okinawa – Okinawa Kaiho Bank SC

* After Miyagi prefectural qualification tournament was canceled due to 2011 Tōhoku earthquake and tsunami, Miyagi Football Association proposed that Sony Sendai represent Miyagi Prefecture since it is the most successful amateur team in the prefecture and represented the prefecture last year. Japan Football Association approved the proposal.

Prime Minister Cup University football tournament winners – 1 team
Osaka University of Health and Sport Sciences

Starting in the Second Round
J.League Division 1 – 18 teams

Vegalta Sendai
Montedio Yamagata
Kashima Antlers
Kashiwa Reysol
Omiya Ardija
Urawa Red Diamonds
Kawasaki Frontale
Yokohama F. Marinos
Ventforet Kofu
Shimizu S-Pulse
Júbilo Iwata
Nagoya Grampus
Albirex Niigata
Cerezo Osaka
Gamba Osaka
Vissel Kobe
Sanfrecce Hiroshima
Avispa Fukuoka

J.League Division 2 – 20 teams

Consadole Sapporo
Mito HollyHock
Tochigi SC
Thespa Kusatsu
JEF United Chiba
FC Tokyo
Tokyo Verdy
Yokohama FC
Shonan Bellmare
Kataller Toyama
FC Gifu
Kyoto Sanga
Fagiano Okayama
Gainare Tottori
Tokushima Vortis
Ehime FC
Giravanz Kitakyushu
Sagan Tosu
Roasso Kumamoto
Oita Trinita

Japan Football League – 2 teams
Honda Lock
FC Ryukyu
※Clubs that occupied two top places at the end of the 17th round (11th week) of 2011 Japan Football League.

Matches
All matches are Japan Standard Time (UTC+09:00)

First round
Due to Tropical Storm Talas (2011 Japanese Typhoon 12), four matches were postponed.

Note: The original schedule was 3 September 13:00 but postponed due to tropical storm.

Note: The original schedule was 3 September 15:00 but postponed due to tropical storm.

Note: The original schedule was 3 September 15:00 but postponed due to tropical storm.

Note: The original schedule was 3 September 13:00 and but postponed due to tropical storm. The original venue was Naruto Otsuka Sports Park Pocarisweat Stadium but changed as a result of the postponement.

Second round

Note: The venue of the match was originally planned to be Hiroshima Big Arch football ground 1 but changed on June 28.

Third round

Note: The venue of the match was originally planned to be Kashiwanoha Park Stadium but changed due to stadium maintenance.

Fourth round

Note: The original schedule was December 17 13:00 but changed due to Reysol's participation in 2011 FIFA Club World Cup.

Quarter finals

Semi finals

Final

 First final to feature two second-tier teams and first to feature such team since 1994 final.
 Third time a second-tier champion wins the final since 1981 and 1982 finals.
 Nakayama's goal was the first to be scored in the year 2012.

External links
 Official site of the 91st Emperor's Cup

References

2011 domestic association football cups
2011
2011 in Japanese football
2012 in Japanese football